The men's 30 kilometre cross-country skiing competition at the 1972 Winter Olympics in Sapporo, Japan, was held on Friday 4 February at the Makomanai Cross Country Events Site.

Each skier started at half a minute intervals, skiing the entire 30 kilometre course. Vyacheslav Vedenin of the Soviet Union was the 1970 World champion and Franco Nones of Italy was the defending Olympic champion from the 1968 Olympics in Grenoble, France.

Results
Sources:

References

External links
 Final results (International Ski Federation)

Men's cross-country skiing at the 1972 Winter Olympics
Men's 30 kilometre cross-country skiing at the Winter Olympics